The Island of Desire is a lost 1917 silent film adventure directed by Otis Turner, produced and distributed by Fox Film Corporation and starring George Walsh.

Cast
George Walsh - Bruce Chalmers
Patricia Palmer - Leila Denham
Anna Luther - Miss Needham
Herschel Mayall - Henry Sayres
William Burress - Tuan Yuck
William Clifford - Toari
Kamuela C. Searle - Tomi(*billed Sam Searles)
Hector Sarno - Hamuka
Marie McKeen - Ella Sayers
Willard Louis - Sam Sweet
Don the Dog - canine

See also
1937 Fox vault fire

References

External links
 

1917 films
American silent feature films
Lost American films
Fox Film films
1917 adventure films
American adventure films
American black-and-white films
Lost adventure films
Films directed by Otis Turner
1910s American films
Silent adventure films